The J. B. Tyrrell Historical Medal is an award of the Royal Society of Canada "for outstanding work in the history of Canada." It was established in 1927, endowed by the Canadian geologist and amateur historian Joseph Burr Tyrrell. The medal is awarded every two years if there is a suitable candidate. The award consists of a gold plated silver medal.

Recipients

See also

 List of history awards

References
Canadian non-fiction literary awards
Awards established in 1927
1927 establishments in Canada
History awards
Royal Society of Canada

External links 
RSC Medals & Awards - Past Award Winners